Falconbridge may refer to:

Falconbridge Ltd., a Canadian mining company
Falconbridge, Middlesex County, Ontario
Falconbridge, Greater Sudbury, Ontario

People:
Lord Falconbridge, an alternative title for barons, viscounts, and earls of Fauconberg.
Jonathan Falconbridge Kelly (1817-1855), American author who published as "Falconbridge"
Alexander Falconbridge (1760–1791), British surgeon and anti-slavery activist
Anna Maria Falconbridge (1769-1835), British author
William Glenholme Falconbridge (1846–1920), Canadian judge and lawyer

See also
The Bastard of Fauconberg